Elsener is a surname. Notable people with the surname include:

Karl Elsener (inventor) (1860–1918), inventor of the Swiss Army knife
Karl Elsener (footballer) (born 1934), retired Swiss football goalkeeper
Patsy Elsener (born 1929), American diver who competed in the 1948 Summer Olympics
Ramona Elsener (born 1992), Swiss ice dancer
Rudolf Elsener (born 1953), retired Swiss football striker